"Never Gonna Fall in Love Again" is a song co-written and recorded by American pop rock artist Eric Carmen. It was released as the second single from Carmen's self-titled debut solo album, the song peaked at number 11 on the US Billboard Hot 100 chart in June 1976, remaining in the Top 40 for ten weeks. The song reached number one on the Billboard Easy Listening chart. In Canada, it was a number-one hit on both charts.

The melody of "Never Gonna Fall in Love Again" is based on the third movement (Adagio) from Symphony No. 2 by Russian composer Sergei Rachmaninoff.

On his second solo LP, Boats Against the Current, Carmen had a subsequent Top 40 hit entitled "She Did It", a happy answer to the loneliness and lovelessness described in this song and its equally melancholy predecessor, "All By Myself".

Television performance
Carmen performed "Never Gonna Fall in Love Again" and his prior hit, "All By Myself" on The Midnight Special television program on July 23, 1976 (season 4, episode 37).  The show was hosted by The Spinners.

Charts

Weekly charts

Year-end charts

Notable cover versions
Australian singer songwriter Mark Holden's 1975 debut studio album Dawn in Darkness, consisting entirely of original songs, sold approximately 2,000 copies, becoming a commercial failure. In April 1976 Holden received a call from Colin Petersen, EMI Music Australia's A&R, who suggested he cover "Never Gonna Fall in Love Again". In his 2017 autobiography, Holden said recording it "was a chance for me to have a hit". Holden promoted the song by performing the track on Countdown, where he performed the track while handing out red carnations to the audience. It became an infamous performance which led to Holden's nickname of "The Carnation Kid" The version, released in April 1976 as his debut single, peaked at number 13 on the Kent Music Report, becoming a commercial success. The song was the 71st biggest selling single in Australia in 1976.

Unlike "All by Myself," Carmen's version of "Never Gonna Fall in Love Again" was not released in Australia and therefore did not chart.  However, Dana reached #31 in the UK in 1976 with the song.  Her British release charted concurrently with Carmen's and Holden's versions.

See also
List of number-one adult contemporary singles of 1976 (U.S.)
List of number-one singles of 1976 (Canada)

References

External links
 ShieldSquare Captcha - Listen to "Never Gonna Fall in Love Again"
 

1975 songs
1976 singles
Eric Carmen songs
Mark Holden songs
John Travolta songs
Songs written by Eric Carmen
RPM Top Singles number-one singles
Song recordings produced by Jimmy Ienner
Pop ballads
Arista Records singles
Songs about heartache
Songs about loneliness
1970s ballads
Popular songs based on classical music